Dardasht may refer to:
 Dardasht (Tehran)
 Dardasht (Isfahan)